David Sze is an entrepreneur, investor, and managing partner at the venture capital firm Greylock Partners.

Sze has also been named to Forbes' prestigious Midas List multiple years in a row. In 2013, he was No. 10; in 2012, he was No. 4. Sze and Reid Hoffman also recently announced Greylock's XIV (14th) fund of $1 billion.

Past investments

NOCpulse (Acquired by Red Hat in 2002), New Edge Networks (Acquired by EarthLink in 2006), Oodle (Acquired by QVC in 2013), Revision3 (Acquired by Discovery Communications in 2012), SGN (Acquired by MindJolt in 2011), SoftCoin (Acquired by You Technology in 2008), VUDU (Acquired by Walmart in 2010), Digg (Acquired by Betaworks in 2012)

History
Before joining Greylock Partners in 2000, David was SVP of Product Strategy at Excite and then Excite@Home. As an early employee at Excite, David also held roles as GM of Excite.com and VP of Content and Programming for the Excite Network.

When David joined Greylock in 2000, he was advised to focus on enterprise investing despite a love for consumer technology. This was a focus he readily admits wasn't the right one for him: "The first couple of years, I was told I should be an enterprise investor. I went out and proved that I was a bad enterprise investor in the early 2000s. That’s probably forgotten. In 2002, 2003, it wasn’t working. I was either getting fired, or I was going to leave."

His self-proclaimed failure as an enterprise investor and his desire to focus on consumer companies is what led to Greylock to establish a foothold in Silicon Valley. Greylock moved the firm headquarters from Boston to Silicon Valley’s Sand Hill Road—a move that Sze and his partner Aneel Bhusri are credited with: "Far from the heart of the Valley, [Sze & Bhusri] struggled to gain credibility with local startups. Some of Greylock’s East Coast partners were also skeptical, but most decided the firm’s future was out west. “We couldn’t be perceived as a venture firm in Silicon Valley where every decision had to run through the East Coast,” says partner Bill Helman. “That was death.”"

By mid-2000, Sze & Greylock established a recognizable foothold in Silicon Valley—quickly known as a firm with an equal focus on enterprise and consumer tech. Sze led early investments in companies including Facebook, Pandora and LinkedIn in addition to Workday and Palo Alto Networks. Greylock held a 16% stake at the 2011 IPO of Facebook and a 14% stake at 2011 IPO of Pandora.

In addition to his product insights, Sze is also known for his candor and humility. He's often shared his regret on declining to invest early in Twitter, and he’s also been open about the specific reasons why he led LinkedIn's Series B investment and why he was so bullish on his now colleague and partner, Reid Hoffman. He said in a blog post, (5) “I am very enthusiastic about this opportunity. I think [LinkedIn] are well on the way to being impossible to catch in their space from network development, and they have the potential to build a much more addictive experience on top of that userbase, and to monetize it in ways that are relatively non-jarring to their users, and with large revenues and margin potential. I also think Reid is world-class in this type of business and am excited to work with him.”

Family
His sister is artist Sarah Sze. His grandfather Szeming Sze was involved in establishing the U.N.'s World Health Organization.

References

Year of birth missing (living people)
Living people
American people of Chinese descent
American businesspeople
Stanford Graduate School of Business alumni
Yale University alumni